Patryk Aleksandrowicz (born 5 June 1983) is a Polish footballer who plays as a midfielder for Polish club Kujawianka Izbica Kujawska.

He previously played in Greece, and for Polonia.

Aleksandrowicz was an important member of Kavala F.C.'s 2008–09 Beta Ethniki campaign, but after the club gained promotion, he was loaned to Thrasyvoulos F.C., a club that was relegated from the Super League. Aleksandrowicz would make a few Super League appearances for Kavala when he returned for the 2010–11 season, and then had brief spells in the Beta Ethniki with Doxa Drama F.C., Iraklis Psachna F.C., Ethnikos Gazoros F.C. and Athlitiki Enosi Larissa F.C.

References

External links
 
 
 Profile at Sportlarissa.gr

1983 births
Living people
Polish footballers
Sportspeople from Lower Silesian Voivodeship
People from Zgorzelec
Association football midfielders
Polonia Warsaw players
Znicz Pruszków players
Marko F.C. players
Kavala F.C. players
Thrasyvoulos F.C. players
Doxa Drama F.C. players
Wigry Suwałki players
Iraklis Psachna F.C. players
Athlitiki Enosi Larissa F.C. players
Panegialios F.C. players
Agrotikos Asteras F.C. players
Elana Toruń players
Sparta Brodnica players
Ekstraklasa players
II liga players
III liga players
IV liga players
Super League Greece players
Football League (Greece) players
Gamma Ethniki players
Polish expatriate footballers
Expatriate footballers in Greece
Polish expatriate sportspeople in Greece